Sphegina varifacies is a species of hoverfly in the family Syrphidae.

Distribution
France.

References

Eristalinae
Insects described in 1991
Diptera of Europe